Dharam Sankat is a 1991 Indian Bollywood Action drama film directed by N.D. Kothari and produced by Umesh N. Kothari. It stars Vinod Khanna and Amrita Singh in pivotal roles.

Cast
 Vinod Khanna as Birju
 Amrita Singh as Madhu
 Dara Singh as Daaku Dara Singh (Birju's Father)
 Rohini Hattangadi as Durga Devi (Birju's Mother)
 Amrish Puri as Jagira
 Raj Babbar as Police Officer Gopal
 Shakti Kapoor as Insp. Heeralal
 Asrani as	Const. Pannalal
 Sahila Chaddha as Sohn Kanwar

Soundtrack

External links

References

1990s Hindi-language films
1991 films
Films scored by Kalyanji Anandji
Indian action drama films